On September 2, 1642, just after the First English Civil War had begun, the Long Parliament ordered the closure of all London theatres. The order cited the current "times of humiliation" and their incompatibility with "public stage-plays", representative of "lascivious Mirth and Levity". The closure was the culmination of the rising anti-theatrical sentiment among Puritans, and along with William Prynne's Histriomastix (1633), its text was the most notorious attack on theatre in English history. 

The ban, which was not completely effective, was reinforced by an Act of 11 February 1648, at the beginning of the Second Civil War. It provided for the treatment of actors as rogues, the demolition of theatre seating, and fines for spectators.

On 24 January 1643, the actors pleaded with Parliament to reopen the theatres by writing  a pamphlet called 'The Actors remonstrance or complaint for the silencing of their profession, and banishment from their severall play-houses', in which they state, "wee have purged our stages of all obscene and scurrilous jests."

In 1660, after the English Restoration brought King Charles II to effective power in England, the theatrical ban was lifted. Under a new licensing system, two London theatres with royal patents were opened: the King's Company and the Duke's Company.

Details of orders:

 2 September 1642: Order for Stage-plays to cease
 22 October 1647: An Ordinance for the Lord Major and City of London, and the Justices of Peace to suppress Stage-playes and Interludes.
 11 February 1648: An Ordinance for the utter suppression and abolishing of all Stage-Plays and Interludes, within the Penalties to be inflicted on the Actors and Spectators therein expressed

See also
 King's Men § Aftermath for the history of one company affected by the prohibition
 William Robbins (actor)  an actor who lost his living, and fought and died for the Royalist cause.
 Antitheatricality 16th and 17th century
 The Cambridge History of British Theatre from Roman colony origins through the twentieth century.

Notes

1642 in England
Theatre in the United Kingdom
17th century in London
Cultural history of England